George Sutherland Thomson FRSE FCS (1871–1958) was a 20th-century Scottish biochemist and scientific author, and an expert in the dairy industry.

Life

He was born in Scotland in 1871.

In 1903 he was elected a Fellow of the Royal Society of Edinburgh. His proposers were Robert Patrick Wright, George Alexander Gibson, James Blyth and Ralph Stockman.

In March 1904 he was appointed Government Dairy Expert to Queensland in Australia. He became Dairy Commissioner for South Australia.

He died on 29 June 1958.

Publications

The Dairying Industry (1907)
British Colonial Dairying for School, Farm and Factory (1913)
Experiments in the Hand-Feeding of Cows
Grading Dairy Produce (1925)
Butter and Cheese (1925)
Testing Milk and its Products (1926)
Milk and Cream Testing
Dairying: Paying for Fat in Milk and Cream (1939)

References

1871 births
1958 deaths
Fellows of the Royal Society of Edinburgh
Australian agronomists